Pietrosella is a French commune in the department of Corse-du-Sud, on the island of Corsica.

History
On 6 September 1997, members of the National Liberation Front of Corsica stormed a gendarmerie barracks at Pietrosella. The weapons stolen from the attack were used to assassinate Claude Érignac on 6 February 1998, homicide committed by Yvan Colonna who was arrested and sentenced to life imprisonment.

Population

See also
Torra di l'Isuledda
Communes of the Corse-du-Sud department

References

Communes of Corse-du-Sud
Corse-du-Sud communes articles needing translation from French Wikipedia